A digital influencer is a digital media content creator who uses his/her media platforms to influence audience behavior both online and offline.

Digital influencer may also refer to:
 Internet celebrity
 Digital marketing
 Social media marketing
 Influencer marketing
 Virtual influencer